In Greek mythology, Ischys (Ancient Greek: Ἰσχύς means 'strength') was the son of Elatus and Hippea.

Mythology 
Ischys had an affair with the Thessalian princess Coronis, one of Apollo's lovers, who was at that time pregnant with the god's child. When a (then white) raven told Apollo of the affair between Ischys and Coronis, he became so angry that his intense glare scorched the raven black. His twin sister Artemis killed Coronis as a punishment, but the unborn child was saved at the last minute by Apollo who felt remorse for causing his lover's death. Ischys was then killed by Apollo's father Zeus or Apollo himself.

The mortal lover of Coronis was also known as Alcyoneus or Lycus.

Notes

References 
 Antoninus Liberalis, The Metamorphoses of Antoninus Liberalis translated by Francis Celoria (Routledge 1992). Online version at the Topos Text Project.
 Apollodorus, The Library with an English Translation by Sir James George Frazer, F.B.A., F.R.S. in 2 Volumes, Cambridge, MA, Harvard University Press; London, William Heinemann Ltd. 1921. ISBN 0-674-99135-4. Online version at the Perseus Digital Library. Greek text available from the same website.
 Gaius Julius Hyginus, Fabulae from The Myths of Hyginus translated and edited by Mary Grant. University of Kansas Publications in Humanistic Studies. Online version at the Topos Text Project.
 Graves, Robert, The Greek Myths: The Complete and Definitive Edition. Penguin Books Limited. 2017. 
 Pausanias, Description of Greece with an English Translation by W.H.S. Jones, Litt.D., and H.A. Ormerod, M.A., in 4 Volumes. Cambridge, MA, Harvard University Press; London, William Heinemann Ltd. 1918. . Online version at the Perseus Digital Library
 Pausanias, Graeciae Descriptio. 3 vols. Leipzig, Teubner. 1903.  Greek text available at the Perseus Digital Library.

Lapiths in Greek mythology
Deeds of Apollo
Deeds of Zeus